La hantise is a 1912 short silent film directed by Louis Feuillade. The film stars Renée Carl and René Navarre. The film focuses on a woman who is told by a palm reader that one of her loved ones will die. The woman then tries to convince her husband not to board the RMS Titanic, as she fears for his safety. The film is said to confront the fraud of palm reading, highlighting the suffering that obsessive belief in the supernatural can create.

Cast
Renée Carl as Madame Trévoux
René Navarre as Jean Trévoux
Miss Édith as The Palmist
Henri Jullien as Madame Trévoux' Godfather
Maurice Mathieu as Little Georges

References

External links
 
 

French silent short films
1912 films
French black-and-white films
1910s French films